Below is a list of the Dutch Top 40 number-one singles of 2015. The Dutch Top 40 is a chart that ranks the best-performing singles of the Netherlands. It is published every week by radio station Radio 538.

Chart history

Number-one artists

See also
2015 in music

References

Number-one singles
Netherlands
2015